Larry Audlaluk  (born 1953) is an Inuk activist and writer from Canada who was among those forcibly relocated during the High Arctic relocation program. He was inducted as a Member of the Order of Canada in 2007.

His memoir, What I Remember, What I Know: The Life of a High Arctic Exile, was a shortlisted finalist for the Governor General's Award for English-language non-fiction at the 2021 Governor General's Awards.

Early life and relocation 
Audlaluk was born in Inukjuak, Quebec in 1953. Audlaluk's family was one of several who were forcibly relocated by the Canadian government to Grise Fiord, Nunavut in the High Arctic relocation incident of the 1950s. 

His family struggled through poverty; Audlaluk sustained an eye injury in childhood and suffered pain for nearly four years before the federal government finally flew him to Montreal for medical treatment. By 2008, Audlaluk would become Grise Fiord's longest-living resident.

Activism and career 
Audlaluk emerged as a community leader in adulthood, and testified about his experiences to the Royal Commission on Aboriginal Peoples in 1993. Audlaluk unsuccessfully stood in the 2004 Nunavut general election in the Quttiktuq electoral district.

Support for Israel 
In 1996, Audlaluk traveled to Israel and was described as "the Holy Land’s best known Inuk" due to his appearances on local television. In an article about the 2004 Nunavuk election, Nunatsiaq News  stated that:"Audlaluk is also known for his frequent visits to the Holy Land where he’s become Israel’s favourite Inuk and Nunavut’s unofficial ambassador."

What I Remember, What I Know 
What I Remember, What I Know was published in 2020. In addition to the Governor General's Awards, the book was also shortlisted for the 2021 J. W. Dafoe Book Prize.

Honors 
In 2007, he was inducted as a Member of the Order of Canada to honor his record of community service in Grise Fiord.

References

1953 births
Living people
21st-century Canadian non-fiction writers
21st-century Canadian male writers
Canadian male non-fiction writers
Canadian memoirists
Canadian activists
Members of the Order of Canada
Inuit from Quebec
Inuit from Nunavut
Inuit writers
Writers from Quebec
Writers from Nunavut
People from Grise Fiord